Sueño is a 2005 comedy-drama film directed by Renée Chabria and starring John Leguizamo, Ana Claudia Talancón, and Elizabeth Peña.

Cast
 John Leguizamo as Antonio
 Ana Claudia Talancón as Nina
 Elizabeth Peña as Mirabela
 Nestor Serrano as El Zorro
 José María Yazpik as Pancho
 Jsu Garcia as Rafael

References

External links

2005 films
2005 comedy-drama films
American comedy-drama films
2005 comedy films
2005 drama films
2000s English-language films
2000s American films